Enemy Territory may refer to:

 Wolfenstein: Enemy Territory, a 2003 sequel to the video game Return to Castle Wolfenstein
 Enemy Territory: Quake Wars, a 2007 video game, part of the same franchise as above
 Enemy Territory (film), a 1987 action film, starring Gary Frank and Ray Parker Jr.
 Enemy Territory, a 2016 thriller movie, starring Adrien Brody